Lort may refer to:

People
 George Lort Phillips (1811–1866), British politician
 John Lort Stokes (1811–1885), British navy officer
 John Lort-Williams (1881–1966), British politician
 Lort baronets of Stackpoole Court, United Kingdom
 Michael Lort (1725–1790), British clergyman, academic and antiquary
 Sampson Lort, British politician
 Sir Roger Lort, 1st Baronet (1607/8–1664), British poet
 William Lort Mansel (1753–1820), British churchman

Places
 Lort Burn, United Kingdom
 Lort River, Australia

Other
 League of Resident Theatres